Isaac Willaerts (1610/1620, Utrecht - 24 June 1693, Utrecht) was a Dutch painter who specialized in coastal landscapes and maritime scenes.

Life and work 
His father was the painter, Adam Willaerts, who gave him his first art lessons. His brothers Abraham and  also became painters. He worked primarily in Utrecht and was a member of the Guild of Saint Luke, where he became an apprentice in 1637, and a Master in 1666.

In 1667, he was commissioned by the City of Utrecht to restore portraits of members of the Brotherhood of Jerusalem, which had been painted in the preceding century by Jan van Scorel.

His style is very similar to that of his brother, Abraham. He often collaborated with other painters, such as Jacob Gillig and Willem Ormea, for whom he painted the background seascapes to accompany his still-lifes of fish.

References

Further reading 
 Barbara Murovec, Matej Klemenčič, Mateja Breščak, Almanach and painting in the second half of the 17th century in Carniola, 2013  Online @ Google Books

External links 

 More works by Willaerts @ ArtNet

17th-century births
1693 deaths
Dutch painters
Dutch marine artists
Artists from Utrecht